Martha O'Driscoll (March 4, 1922 – November 3, 1998) was an American film actress from 1937 until 1947. She retired from the screen in 1947 after marrying her second husband, Arthur I. Appleton, president of Appleton Electric Company in Chicago.

Life and career
O'Driscoll's mother was a financial partner in the Hollywood Mar-Ken School. The school's director, Mrs. Bessire, had a son, William Kent Bessire. The two women decided to name the school after their children—Mar came from Martha and Ken from Kent. The school remained open until the early 1960s.

Trained in singing and dancing, O'Driscoll was seen by choreographer Hermes Pan in a local theater production in Phoenix; Pan suggested to her mother that O'Driscoll might do well in movies. Her mother and she moved to Hollywood in 1935, but Pan was out of town, so they answered an advertisement for dancers. O'Driscoll was given a role in Collegiate (1935), a musical in which Betty Grable had an early leading role. 

O'Driscoll was given more visible parts and began pitching products in magazine advertisements for Max Factor and Royal Crown Cola, among many others. These ads also promoted her upcoming pictures. She had other small dancing roles in Here Comes the Band, The Big Broadcast of 1936, and The Great Ziegfeld. In the last, she was spotted by a Universal talent scout, who arranged for her to have a screen test, followed by a contract. Her roles were initially small; in her first Universal film, She's Dangerous (1937), she was not credited by name. In the Deanna Durbin vehicle Mad About Music (1937), she was billed as "Pretty Girl".  Her face appeared on such advertisements as Charm-Kurl Supreme Cold Wave and Max Factor Hollywood Face Powder. Universal lent O'Driscoll to MGM for parts in The Secret of Dr Kildare (1939) and Judge Hardy and Son (1940), starring Mickey Rooney.

RKO, however, gave O'Driscoll her first two starring roles, as romantic interest to the cowboy Tim Holt in Wagon Train (1940) and notably as Daisy Mae in the first screen version of Al Capp's popular comic strip Li'l Abner (1940), which also featured Buster Keaton.

	

Paramount became interested in the actress and acquired her contract, casting her first as a maid in Preston Sturges's classic comedy, The Lady Eve (1941). Later, she appeared in Cecil B. DeMille's Reap the Wild Wind (1942).  DeMille was too busy filming to appear at Grauman's Theater to plant his prints in concrete for the Walk of Fame, so instead they brought concrete in a mold to him.  O'Driscoll, along with Hedda Hopper and Sid Grauman, were photographed at his side during that moment.

O'Driscoll was then given the lead in the B film Pacific Blackout (1942), starring Robert Preston. The actress followed this with a role in Young and Willing (1943). The studio lent her back to Universal, which cast her in Olsen and Johnson's Crazy House (1943), then  to RKO for Richard Wallace's stylish thriller, The Fallen Sparrow (1943) with Maureen O'Hara.

In the early 1940s, O'Driscoll toured with Errol Flynn and the USO, performing for the troops all over the world. In 1943, she married Lieutenant Commander Richard D. Adams (U.S. Navy) on September 18, 1943, but they separated 10 months later. 

O'Driscoll co-starred with Noah Beery, Jr., in five films. She also starred in the cult classic House of Dracula with Lon Chaney, Jr., and John Carradine; and in Week-End Pass (both 1945). The following year, she made her last Universal film, Blonde Alibi, receiving top billing as a girl who sets out to prove her lover (Tom Neal) innocent of murder. Her last film was Edgar G. Ulmer's Carnegie Hall (1947).

Following her last film and a final divorce decree on July 18, 1947, from her first husband, she married, 2 days later, Chicago businessman Arthur I. Appleton. Appleton was the president of the Appleton Electric Company, founded by his father. Martha retired from show business in 1947 to start a family; the couple had four children: James, John, Linda, and William.

O'Driscoll served as an officer in such Chicago-based organizations as the Sarah Siddons Society, the Ways and Means Committee of Chicago's Junior League, and the Women's Board of the Chicago Boys' Clubs; she was also treasurer of the World's Adoption International Fund. In the 1980s and 1990s, she was a guest speaker at numerous movie-nostalgia conventions.

The Appletons started a horse stud farm, Bridlewood, in Ocala, Florida.  In 1984, the Appletons built and took delivery of a 138-ft Feadship yacht, also named Bridlewood.

In 1984, the couple, along with Arthur Appleton's sister, Edith, built the Appleton Museum of Art in Ocala.

After Appleton retired, O'Driscoll and he spent the remainder of their years between their home in Chicago, Bridlewood Farm, and their home in Miami on Indian Creek Island.

Death
O'Driscoll died on November 3, 1998, aged 76, in Indian Creek Village, Florida.

Partial filmography

Three Cheers for Love (1936) .... Chorine (uncredited)
She's Dangerous (1937) .... Blonde Girl (uncredited)
Mad About Music (1938) .... Pretty Girl (uncredited)
Girls' School (1938) .... Grace
The Secret of Dr. Kildare (1939) .... Mrs. Roberts
Judge Hardy and Son (1939) .... Leonora V. 'Elvie' Horton
Laddie (1940) .... Sally Pryor
Forty Little Mothers (1940) .... Janette
Wagon Train (1940) .... Helen Lee
Li'l Abner (1940) .... Daisy Mae Scraggs
The Lady Eve (1941) .... Martha
Her First Beau (1941) .... Julie Harris
Henry Aldrich for President (1941) .... Mary Aldrich
Pacific Blackout (1941) .... Mary Jones
The Remarkable Andrew (1942) .... Beamish's secretary
Reap the Wild Wind (1942) .... Ivy Devereaux
Youth on Parade (1942) .... Sally Carlyle
My Heart Belongs to Daddy (1942) .... Joyce Whitman
Young and Willing (1943) .... Dottie Coburn
Paramount Victory Short No. T2-4: The Aldrich Family Gets in the Scrap (1943, Short) .... Mary Aldrich
We've Never Been Licked (1943) .... Deede Dunham
The Fallen Sparrow (1943) .... Whitney 'The Imp' Parker
Crazy House (1943) .... Marjorie Nelson, alias Marjorie Wyndingham
Week-End Pass (1944) .... Barbara 'Babs' Bradley aka Barbara Lake
Prices Unlimited (1944, Short)
Follow the Boys (1944) .... Martha O'Driscoll
Ghost Catchers (1944) .... Susanna Marshall
Allergic to Love (1944) .... Pat Bradley
Hi, Beautiful (1944) .... Patty Callahan
Under Western Skies (1945) .... Katie Wells
Here Come the Co-Eds (1945) .... Molly McCarthy
Her Lucky Night (1945) .... Connie
Shady Lady (1945) .... Gloria Wendell
The Daltons Ride Again (1945) .... Mary Bohannon
House of Dracula (1945) .... Miliza Morrelle
Blonde Alibi (1946) .... Marian Gale
Down Missouri Way (1946) .... Jane Colwell
Criminal Court (1946) .... Georgia Gale
Carnegie Hall (1947) .... Ruth Haines (final film role)

References

External links

  
 

1922 births
1998 deaths
20th-century American actresses
Actresses from California
American film actresses
Actresses from Tulsa, Oklahoma
Universal Pictures contract players